Adelhbola Christophe Aïfimi (born 21 August 1989), known as Christophe Aïfimi, is a Beninese footballer who plays as a goalkeeper for Equatorial Guinean club Futuro Kings FC.

References

1989 births
Living people
Association football goalkeepers
Beninese footballers
Stella Club d'Adjamé players
AS Tanda players
Black Leopards F.C. players
Futuro Kings FC players
South African Premier Division players
National First Division players
Beninese expatriate footballers
Beninese expatriate sportspeople in Ivory Coast
Expatriate footballers in Ivory Coast
Beninese expatriate sportspeople in South Africa
Expatriate soccer players in South Africa
Beninese expatriate sportspeople in Equatorial Guinea
Expatriate footballers in Equatorial Guinea